Voodoo, in comics, may refer to:

Characters
 Voodoo (Wildstorm), a Wildstorm and DC Comics character
 Voodoo Man, a character who appeared in a number of titles from Fox Feature Syndicate
 Voodoo Ben, a character from Scud: The Disposable Assassin
 Brother Voodoo, a Marvel Comics character also known as Doctor Voodoo

Print media
 Voodoom, a comic by Oni Press
 Tales of Voodoo, a comic book series by Eerie Publications
 Voodoo Child (comics), a Virgin Comics title

See also
 Voodoo (disambiguation)